Benson Creek is a  long 1st order tributary to Stewarts Creek in Surry County, North Carolina.

Variant names
According to the Geographic Names Information System, it has also been known historically as:
Dinfield Creek

Course 
Benson Creek rises in a pond about 4 miles east-northeast of Crooked Oak, North Carolina and then flows southeast to join Stewarts Creek about 2 miles west-northwest of Toast, North Carolina.

Watershed 
Benson Creek drains  of area, receives about 47.8 in/year of precipitation, has a wetness index of 324.48, and is about 57% forested.

See also 
 List of Rivers of North Carolina

References 

Rivers of Surry County, North Carolina
Rivers of North Carolina